is a Japanese football player. He plays for FC Ryukyu.

Career
Desheun Ryo Yamakawa joined J3 League club FC Ryukyu in 2016.

Club statistics
Updated to 20 February 2017.

References

External links

Profile at FC Ryukyu

1997 births
Living people
Association football people from Okinawa Prefecture
Japanese footballers
J3 League players
FC Ryukyu players
Association football forwards